Tokyo Torch is a large-scale redevelopment district near Tokyo Station in Tokyo, Japan. It will consist of two skyscrapers:

 Tokiwabashi Tower (completed in 2021)
 Torch Tower (scheduled to be completed in 2027 as Japan's tallest building)

In addition to the skyscrapers, the district will have two other buildings. In total, it will cover a 31,400-square-meter area near the Marunouchi commercial district. Seeing a strong demand for office space, developer Mitsubishi Estate said it was building the district to create renewed interest in the area as a business destination.

Tokyo Torch will also include a large plaza, the Tokyo Torch Terrace, for visitors and employees who work in the towers. It was initially open in 2021 as a 3,000-square meter open space with turf and cherry blossoms, but will be expanded to a 7,000-square meter plaza in 2027 to fill the space between the buildings. Developers said plans for the outdoor spaces were expanded in light of the COVID-19 pandemic.

Tokyo Torch will be directly connected to Ōtemachi subway station, which is right next to Tokyo Station. When construction is complete, the district will include an underground pedestrian walkway which connects people to nearby transportation hubs.

On September 17, 2020, it was announced that the name of the redevelopment area had been decided as "Tokyo Torch", and the official names of the skyscrapers as "Tokiwabashi Tower" and "Torch Tower". The name, "Tokyo Torch", was chosen in the hope that it will "illuminate Japan", in particular the Torch Tower, which will have a torch-inspired design. The project is expected to cost about ¥500 billion (4.77 billion U.S. dollars).

Project schedule
 2017
 Start of demolition of buildings on the planned construction site of the Tokiwabashi Tower.

 2018
 Completion of demolition work on the site of the Tokiwabashi Tower.
 Start of construction of the Tokiwabashi Tower.

 2021
 Completion of the Tokiwabashi Tower.
 Start of demolition of buildings on the planned construction site of the Torch Tower.

 2023
 Completion of demolition work on the site of the Torch Tower.
 Start of construction of the Torch Tower.

 2027
 Completion of the Torch Tower.
 Completion of the plaza.

References

External links
 Official website

Chiyoda, Tokyo
Redevelopment projects in Japan